
Davis v. Beason, 133 U.S. 333 (1890), was a United States Supreme Court case affirming, by a 9–0 vote, that federal laws against polygamy did not conflict with the free exercise clause of the First Amendment to the United States Constitution.

Background
Congress had passed the Edmunds Act in 1882, which made polygamy a felony; over 1,300 Mormons were imprisoned.  The Act also required test oaths requiring voters to swear they were not bigamists or polygamists.  A statute of the Idaho Territory required a similar oath in order to register to vote, in order to limit or eliminate Mormons' participation in government and their control of local schools. The loyalty also forbade being a member of any organization that advocated or spent resources defending bigamy or polygamy.

Mormons initiated a challenge to Idaho's oath test by having members who did not have plural marriages registering to vote.  Samuel D. Davis, a resident of Oneida County, Idaho, was convicted in the territorial district court of swearing falsely after taking the voter's oath.  Davis appealed his conviction via a habeas corpus writ, claiming that the Idaho law requiring the oath violated his right to the free exercise of his religion as a member of the LDS Church.

Supreme Court ruling
Justice Field, writing for the Court, condemned polygamy, writing that "Few crimes are more pernicious to the best interests of society, and receive more general or more deserved punishment."  He went on to echo Reynolds v. United States (1878): "However free the exercise of religion may be, it must be subordinate to the criminal laws of the country, passed with reference to actions regarded by general consent as properly the subjects of punitive legislation."  He wrote by way of comparison that if a religious sect advocated fornication or human sacrifice, "swift punishment would follow the carrying into effect of its doctrines, and no heed would be given to the pretense that, as religious beliefs, their supporters could be protected in their exercise by the Constitution of the United States."

Field listed the limits that federal law placed upon the rights of United States territories to qualify voters, noted Idaho's specific prohibition of polygamists and people encouraging polygamy from the right to vote, and wrote that this was "not open to any constitutional or legal objection," as the Idaho law "simply excludes from the privilege of voting ... those who have been convicted of certain offenses".

Subsequent events
Richard Morgan wrote, "The decision became one of the principal underpinnings of what later came to be called the 'secular regulation' approach to the free exercise clause whereby no religious exemptions are required from otherwise valid secular regulations."

106 years later, in Romer v. Evans (1996), the Supreme Court ruled unconstitutional a Colorado constitutional initiative that prevented any jurisdiction from protecting homosexual citizens from discrimination.  In the dissent, Justice Scalia asked how Romer could be reconciled with Davis v. Beason:

References

External links
 
 

1890 in United States case law
Legal history of Idaho
United States law and polygamy in Mormonism
Political history of Idaho
United States elections case law
United States free exercise of religion case law
United States Supreme Court cases
United States Supreme Court cases of the Fuller Court
The Church of Jesus Christ of Latter-day Saints in Idaho
1890 in Christianity
1890 in Idaho Territory
19th-century Mormonism
Christianity and law in the 19th century
Oneida County, Idaho